Robert Michael Adams (born July 24, 1948) is a former backup outfielder in Major League Baseball who played from  through  for the Minnesota Twins, Chicago Cubs and Oakland Athletics. Adams batted and threw right-handed.

Coming from a baseball family, Adams is the son of second baseman Bobby Adams and nephew of first baseman Dick Adams.

Adams reached the majors in 1972 with the Minnesota Twins, spending two years with them before moving to the Cubs and Athletics. In 1973 with Minnesota, Adams posted career-highs in games played (55), hits (14), runs (21), home runs (3) and RBI (six). 
 
In parts of five seasons, Adams was a .195 hitter (23-for-118) with a .375 OBP, three home runs and nine RBI in 100 games.

See also
List of second-generation Major League Baseball players

Further reading
The ESPN Baseball Encyclopedia – Gary Gillette, Peter Gammons, Pete Palmer. Publisher: Sterling Publishing, 2005. Format: Paperback, 1824pp. Language: English.

External links
, or Retrosheet

1948 births
Living people
American expatriate baseball players in Canada
Baseball players from Cincinnati
Cardenales de Lara players
American expatriate baseball players in Venezuela
Chicago Cubs players
Florida Instructional League Tigers players
Fullerton Hornets baseball players
Lakeland Tigers players
Major League Baseball outfielders
Minnesota Twins players
Oakland Athletics players
Portland Beavers players
Rocky Mount Leafs players
Tacoma Twins players
Vancouver Canadians players
Wichita Aeros players